Armstrong is a town in Bryan County, Oklahoma, United States, along the Blue River. The population was 105 at the 2010 census, a 25.2 percent decrease from the figure of 141 recorded in 2000. The town was named for Frank C. Armstrong, a member of the Dawes Commission.

History
The town of Armstrong began along the route of the Missouri-Kansas-Texas Railroad (Katy) in 1872. At the time of Armstrong's founding it was located in Blue County of the Choctaw Nation.  The town had a post office in 1882–3, but thereafter the mail was sent to Caddo. In 1896, another post office opened in Armstrong, but it was closed in 1920. The post office was located in the only grocery store, and the store owner was also the postmaster. In 1911, the population was 41.

The Oklahoma Office of the Game Warden (now the Department of Wildlife Conservation) established a fish hatchery in the town about 1916. Otherwise the town survived economically by serving small farms in the area and catering to the needs of sport fishermen  who were attracted to the Blue River and nearby Lake Texoma, By 1980, the town had 133 residents. The population dropped to 122 in 1990, then rose to 141 in 2000. It dropped again, and was 105 in 2010.

Geography
Armstrong is located at  (34.052530, -96.344193).

Demographics

As of the census of 2010, there were 105 people living in the town. The population density was 1,638.3 people per square mile (604.9/km2). The racial makeup of the town was 70.21% White, 0.71% African American, 21.99% Native American, and 7.09% from two or more races.

There were 54 households, out of which 37.0% had children under the age of 18 living with them, 57.4% were married couples living together, 3.7% had a female householder with no husband present, and 33.3% were non-families. 20.4% of all households were made up of individuals, and 9.3% had someone living alone who was 65 years of age or older. The average household size was 2.61 and the average family size was 3.11.

In the town, the population was spread out, with 27.0% under the age of 18, 2.8% from 18 to 24, 35.5% from 25 to 44, 21.3% from 45 to 64, and 13.5% who were 65 years of age or older. The median age was 35 years. For every 100 females, there were 101.4 males. For every 100 females age 18 and over, there were 94.3 males.

The median income for a household in the town was $27,292, and the median income for a family was $30,556. Males had a median income of $20,833 versus $18,125 for females. The per capita income for the town was $12,765. There were 5.6% of families and 16.2% of the population living below the poverty line, including none under 18 and 25.0% of those over 64.

References

External links
 Encyclopedia of Oklahoma History and Culture - Armstrong

Towns in Bryan County, Oklahoma
Towns in Oklahoma